Slayton may refer to:

People with the given name
 Slayton A. Evans, Jr. (1943–2001), American chemist

People with the surname
 Chris Slayton (born 1995), American football player
 Darius Slayton (born 1997), American football player
 Deke Slayton (1924–1993), one of the original 7 Mercury astronauts
 Bobby Slayton (born 1955), American comedian
 John W. Slayton (1861–1935), American socialist lecturer and politician
 Paul Wall (born Paul Slayton in 1981), American rapper
 Helen Slayton-Hughes (1930-2022), American actress

Places
United States
 Slayton, Minnesota, a city
 Slaytonville, Arkansas, an unincorporated community